Cumani may be:
 The Latin name of the Cumans
 a surname; persons with the name include:
 Luca Cumani, Italian horse trainer
 Sergio Cumani, Italian horse trainer after whom the Premio Elena e Sergio Cumani race is named
 Francesca Cumani, British horse racing presenter

See also 
 Comani (disambiguation)
 Kumani (disambiguation)